The Junior Orange Bowl is a youth tennis tournament, held in Coral Gables, Florida, for the "14 and under" and "12 and under" age categories. Boys and girls compete in separate draws. Jodi Appelbaum-Steinbauer is the tournament director.

History 
The global Junior Orange Bowl tournament has as competitors the top-ranked male and female 12-and-under and 14-and-under junior players, from over 76 countries.

The Orange Bowl tournament was founded in 1947.  The "14 and under" and "12 and under" tournaments began in 1962. The Junior Orange Bowl tournament was added to the list of Grade A tournaments in 1978. Winners have come from over 20 nations.

Past champions 

 
  
1Prior to 1962 the event was a 13 & under tournament.  In 1962 it became a 14 & under championship.

See also 
 Dunlop Orange Bowl
 Junior Orange Bowl

References

External links 
 Official website
 Past champions

Junior tennis
Recurring sporting events established in 1962
Tennis tournaments in Florida